Tarwin may refer to:

Tarwin, Victoria
Tarwin Lower, Victoria
Tarwin River